IJV may refer to:

International joint venture, when two businesses based in two or more countries form a partnership
Independent Jewish Voices, a Jewish political organization 
Internal jugular vein, in anatomy